The Ismaili Centre, Vancouver is one of six such centres worldwide. It was the first purpose-built Ismaili jamatkhana and the first Ismaili centre in North America. It has accordingly been the subject of sustained, dedicated academic analysis, being noted as a case-study of modern Islamic architecture in the West.

Foundation and Establishment

Established by His Highness Aga Khan IV, the 49th hereditary Imam of the Shia Ismaili Muslims, the Ismaili Centre, Vancouver was the first of such centers in North America and the second in a series of six Ismaili Centres currently situated in London, Lisbon, Dubai, Dushanbe, and Toronto.

The foundation ceremony for the new building was held on 26 July 1982, and construction was completed in 1985. During the silver jubilee of His Highness the Aga Khan, the new building was opened by the former Canadian Prime Minister Brian Mulroney.

Architecture and Design

Designed by the Vancouver architect Bruno Freschi, the building was conceived as an 'ambassadorial building' aiming to give visual architectural expression to the expanding Ismaili community in Canada, and designed 'not just for the use of the members of the Ismaili community, but [...] to become part of the fabric of the civil life of the area'. The centre has been described as 'monumental', 'spectacular' and 'sitting harmoniously' within its environment, reflecting 'traditional Islamic architectural vocabulary in modern context, materials, and craftsmanship'. Its footprint is 3,870 square metres (41,600 square feet), with a basement containing offices and classroom space, and two upper floors, a double-height prayer-hall (reserved for Ismaili worship) and a multi-purpose hall, around a courtyard with a fountain. The prayer-hall is roofed with a series of shallow Turkish-style domes. The design 'attracted international plaudits'.

The faith of Islam is one in which the spiritual and the secular are inextricably linked. As a result, the centre would have to thus reflect both the historical and traditional as well as the contemporary and forward-looking aspirations of the Ismaili community.

References

External links

 'Photo Gallery of the Ismaili Jamatkhana and Centre, Burnaby, Canada', Simerg – Insights from Around the World (April 11, 2009)

Burnaby
1985 establishments in British Columbia
Buildings and structures completed in 1985
Religious buildings and structures in Vancouver
Shia Islam in Canada
20th-century religious buildings and structures in Canada